José Miguel Mercedes Santana (born March 5, 1971) is a former professional baseball pitcher. Mercedes played for the Saraperos de Saltillo of the Mexican League in 2010.

External links

1971 births
Baltimore Orioles players
Bowie Baysox players
Buffalo Bisons (minor league) players
Calgary Cannons players
Dominican Republic expatriate baseball players in Canada
Dominican Republic expatriate baseball players in Mexico
Dominican Republic expatriate baseball players in the United States
El Paso Diablos players
Gulf Coast Orioles players
Iowa Cubs players
Kane County Cougars players
Las Vegas Stars (baseball) players

Living people
Major League Baseball pitchers
Major League Baseball players from the Dominican Republic
Mexican League baseball pitchers
Milwaukee Brewers players
Montreal Expos players
New Orleans Zephyrs players
Norfolk Tides players
Pericos de Puebla players
Saraperos de Saltillo players
Vaqueros Laguna players
Azucareros del Este players
Tigres del Licey players
Tomateros de Culiacán players